Joanne Arnold (born 1 April 1931) is an American actress and model. She was Playboy magazine's Playmate of the Month for the May 1954 issue. She also appeared on the covers of the March 1954 and August 1955 issues.

Filmography
 Invasion of the Star Creatures (1962) (as Gloria Victor) .... Dr. Puna
 Son of Sinbad (1955) (uncredited) .... Raider
 The Adventures of Hajji Baba (1954) (as Joann Arnold) .... Susu
 Girl Gang (1954) .... June
 Marry Me Again (1953) .... W.A.C.
 The Caddy (1953) (uncredited) .... Bathing Beauty
 I Love Melvin (1953) (uncredited) .... Chorine
 Stop, You're Killing Me (1952) (uncredited) .... Party Girl
 You for Me (1952) (uncredited) .... Nurse
 Just This Once (1952) (uncredited) .... Eleanor
 Ten Tall Men (1951) (uncredited) .... Lady in Waiting

See also
 List of people in Playboy 1953–1959

References

External links
 
 

1950s Playboy Playmates
1931 births
Living people